Borer Lake is a lake in Le Sueur County, in the U.S. state of Minnesota.

Borer Lake was named for Felix A. Borer, a county auditor.

References

Lakes of Minnesota
Lakes of Le Sueur County, Minnesota